Solariella varicosa, common name the varicose solarielle, is a species of sea snail, a marine gastropod mollusk in the family Solariellidae.

Distribution
This species occurs in European waters, in the northwest Atlantic Ocean, in circum-arctic waters, in the Pacific Ocean from Alaska to southern California.

Description 
The maximum recorded shell length is 14 mm. The shell is coarse, usually more or less eroded. It has a yellowish white color over a brilliant nacre. The spire contains with five or more moderately rounded whorls. The nucleus is eroded. The distinct suture is not appressed. The axial sculpture shows numerous somewhat irregular narrow close-set wrinkles, extending over the whorl from the suture to the verge of the funicular umbilicus. The spiral sculpture shows a few spiral lines near the umbilicus. The subcircular aperture is oblique and produced above. The lips are joined over the body by a layer of enamel. The dark-brown operculum is multispiral, with 8 or 10 turns.

Habitat 
Minimum recorded depth is 13 m. Maximum recorded depth is 393 m.

References

 Sowerby, G. B., I. 1838. A descriptive catalogue of the species of Leach's genus Margarita. Malacological and Conchological Magazine 1: 23–27
 Mighels, J. W. and C. B. Adams. 1842. Descriptions of twenty-four species of the shells of New England. Boston Journal of Natural History 4: 37–54, pl. 4. 
 Sars, M. 1859. Bidrag til en Skildring af den arctiske Molluskfauna ved Norges nordlige Kyst. Forhandlinger i Videnskabs-Selskabet i Christiania 1: 34–87.
 Brunel, P., Bosse, L. & Lamarche, G. (1998). Catalogue of the marine invertebrates of the estuary and Gulf of St. Lawrence. Canadian Special Publication of Fisheries and Aquatic Sciences, 126. 405 p.
 Gofas, S.; Le Renard, J.; Bouchet, P. (2001). Mollusca, in: Costello, M.J. et al. (Ed.) (2001). European register of marine species: a check-list of the marine species in Europe and a bibliography of guides to their identification. Collection Patrimoines Naturels, 50: pp. 180–213
 Gulbin V.V. & Chaban E.M. (2012) Annotated list of shell-bearing gastropods of Commander Islands. Part I. The Bulletin of the Russian Far East Malacological Society 15–16: 5–30.

External links
 

varicosa
Gastropods described in 1842